Eugen Cătălin Anghel (born 3 December 1973) is a Romanian former professional footballer who played as a goalkeeper.

Honours
ARO Câmpulung
Divizia C: 1994–95
Gloria Bistrița
Cupa României runner-up: 1995–96
Rulmentul Alexandria
Divizia C: 1997–98
Rapid București
Cupa României: 2001–02

Notes

References

1973 births
Living people
Romanian footballers
Liga I players
Liga II players
Liga III players
AFC Rocar București players
ACF Gloria Bistrița players
CSM Ceahlăul Piatra Neamț players
FC Rapid București players
Association football goalkeepers
Sportspeople from Pitești